When the Eagle Flies is the seventh studio album released by English rock band Traffic, in 1974. The album featured Jim Capaldi, Steve Winwood and Chris Wood, with Rosko Gee on bass guitar. Percussionist Rebop Kwaku Baah was fired prior to the album's completion, but two tracks feature his playing. Winwood plays a broader variety of keyboard instruments than most previous Traffic albums, adding Moog to their repertoire. This was the last Traffic album for 20 years, when Winwood and Capaldi reunited for Far from Home in 1994.

When the Eagle Flies was the band's fourth consecutive studio album to reach the American Top Ten and have gold album status. It was far less successful in the United Kingdom, where it entered the charts at number 31 only to drop off the following week. Traffic toured to support the release, but they disbanded in the middle of the tour in 1974.

The Chris Wood composition "Moonchild Vulcan" was recorded for the album, but ultimately left off in favour of "Memories of a Rock n' Rolla". The song was played on the supporting tour for the album, however, and a live recording by Traffic was later released on the posthumous Chris Wood CD Vulcan, released in 2008.

Reception

Rolling Stone called the album uneven, saying that its bleak tone works superbly on "Graveyard People" and "Walking in the Wind", but elsewhere it often "turns anemic as a result of either a poorly conceived arrangement or inadequate production." However, they regarded the use of tighter and more concise songs as a promising change in direction for the band, and recommended the album based on the renewed strength of Winwood/Capaldi's songwriting and Winwood's work with the keyboards.  Allmusic's retrospective review asserted the opposite: that the album indulged in long and meandering instrumentation more than any other work by Traffic, with even the vocals doing no more than "improvising his melodies over the music, paying little heed to the meaning of the words".

Track listing

Personnel 
Traffic
 Steve Winwood – vocals, acoustic piano, organ, Mellotron, Moog synthesizer, guitars 
 Chris Wood – flute, saxophones
 Rosko Gee – bass 
 Jim Capaldi – drums, percussion, backing vocals (5), keyboards
 Rebop Kwaku Baah (uncredited) – congas and percussion (3, 7)

Production 
 Chris Blackwell – producer
 Nobby Clark – engineer
 Brian Humphries – engineer
 Jeff Willens – mastering
 Bill DeYoung – liner notes
 Martin Hughes – cover design
 Bill Levenson – reissue supervisor
 Monique McGuffin – reissue production coordination
 Vartan – reissue art director

Charts

Notes

References

Traffic (band) albums
1974 albums
Albums produced by Chris Blackwell
Island Records albums